John Pickles currently serves as the Phillips Distinguished Professor of International Studies in the Department of Geography at the University of North Carolina at Chapel Hill.  Pickles attended the University of Oxford, where he obtained a bachelor's degree in Geography, with a minor in Geology, and a master's degree in Geography.  He later earned doctorate degrees from the University of Natal, South Africa, and the Pennsylvania State University, United States.  Pickles is a scholar in the areas of critical cartography, phenomenology, geography of media and communication and post-socialist spaces.  He is the author of numerous books, including Phenomenology, Science, and Geography: Space and the Human Sciences, Ground Truth: The Social Implications of Geographical Information Systems, and A History of Spaces: Cartographic Reason, Mapping and the Geo-Coded World.

References

Living people
English geographers
American geographers
University of North Carolina at Chapel Hill faculty
Historians of cartography
Year of birth missing (living people)
Alumni of Mansfield College, Oxford
Pennsylvania State University alumni
University of Natal alumni